Srnojedy is a municipality and village in Pardubice District in the Pardubice Region of the Czech Republic. It has about 800 inhabitants.

Paleontology
In 1893, a few bone fragments of a Cretaceous reptile (presumably a small dinosaur of uncertain affinities) were found here. Antonín Frič named it Albisaurus scutifer in 1905.

References

External links

Villages in Pardubice District